Marissa Callaghan (born 2 September 1985) is a Northern Irish women's association football player from Belfast, Northern Ireland. She currently plays as a player-coach as a midfielder for Cliftonville Ladies and is the captain of the Northern Ireland women's national football team.

Football 
Callaghan started playing football when she was thirteen for Newington Girls (now known as Cliftonville Ladies). After this, she went to university in the United States on a football scholarship. She returned to Northern Ireland in 2005 and started playing for Cliftonville again. She graduated with an advanced certificate in sports coaching from the University of Ulster in 2017. As a result, she also volunteered as a coach for Cliftonville Ladies. Later she became their academy director.

International career
Callaghan made her international debut for the Northern Ireland women's national under-19 football team in 2002. She made her debut for Northern Ireland in 2010. In 2016, Callaghan was awarded the Northern Ireland Women's Football Association Women's Personality of the Year award. A year later she was the tournament ambassador for the 2017 UEFA Women's Under-19 Championship being held in Northern Ireland.

She captained the Northern Ireland team at Euro 2022.

International goals

Career 
After leaving university, Callaghan started working full-time in 2010 as a women's football community coach. In 2016, Callaghan was selected as a women's football ambassador for the Irish Football Association. Following this, she worked with Northern Ireland national football team captain Steven Davis to promote participation in women's youth football.

Private life 
Callaghan is married with her girlfriend Paula and they have together one son.

References 

1985 births
Living people
Northern Ireland women's international footballers
Cliftonville F.C. players
Football managers from Northern Ireland
Alumni of Ulster University
Association footballers from Belfast
Women's association football midfielders
Women's association footballers from Northern Ireland
UEFA Women's Euro 2022 players
British LGBT sportspeople
LGBT association football players
Lesbian sportswomen
21st-century LGBT people from Northern Ireland